"It's Only Natural" is a song by New Zealand-Australian rock group Crowded House from their 1991 album, Woodface. The single was originally issued as a promotional single in June 1991 with the intent to release the song as the lead single for Woodface; however, due to changes made, the single was release until December 1991, when it served as the third single from the album. In the UK, "It's Only Natural" was the fifth Woodface single, released in September 1992. The song reached number 15 in Australia, number 24 on the UK Singles Chart, and number five on the US Modern Rock Chart.

Reception
Junkee said the song was, "deservedly serving as one of [Crowded House's] most revered. Who else but Neil and Tim could put a minor fall after a major lift and still have it sound like pristine pop? Their omnipresent harmonies bolster the song’s already-robust arrangement, creating something thoroughly distinctive and ultimately career-defining."

Track listings
Australian CD one
 "It's Only Natural" – 3:31
 "Dr. Livingstone" – 3:57
 "Fame Is" – 2:21

Australian CD two
 "It's Only Natural" – 3:31
 "Recurring Dream"
 "Hole in the River" (live)
 "Better Be Home Soon"
 "I Walk Away"

1992 European release
 "It's Only Natural" – 3:31
 "Fame Is" – 2:21

UK 7-inch and cassette release
 "It's Only Natural" – 3:31
 "Chocolate Cake"

UK CD one
 "It's Only Natural" – 3:31
 "It's Only Natural" – 6:21 (live, Sheffield City Hall, England 21 June 1992, incl "six months in a leaky boat")
 "Hole in the River" – 5:58 (live, Cambridge Corn Exchange, England, 6 March 1992)
 "The Burglar's Song" – 7:21 (medley) around the UK in 7 minutes, (live, at various locations on the Crowded House European Vacation tour, summer '92)

UK CD two
 "It's Only Natural" – 3:31
 "Sister Madly" – 5:14 (live, Newcastle City Hall, England, 2 March 1992)
 "There Goes God" – 5:35 (live, Brighton Centre, England, 7 July 1992)
 "Chocolate Cake" – 5:45 (live, Wolverhampton Civic Hall, England, 18 June 1992)

German CD
 "It's Only Natural" – 3:31
 "Fame Is" – 2:21
 "Dr. Livingstone" – 3:57

Charts

Release history

Cover versions
A re-recorded version featuring Tim Finn and Bic Runga appears on Tim Finn's 2009 greatest hits album North, South, East, West...Anthology.

In 2011, Lior and Emma Louise released a version, as a single from the album, They Will Have Their Way.

References

Crowded House songs
1991 songs
1991 singles
2011 singles
Capitol Records singles
Emma Louise songs
Song recordings produced by Mitchell Froom
Songs written by Neil Finn
Songs written by Tim Finn